Chintapalli Venkata Ramana Babu (born in Palakol, Andhra Pradesh, India) is a Telugu film writer. His screen name is Chintapalli Ramana.

Personal life 

Chintapalli Ramana was born in Palakol, West Godavari District, Andhra Pradesh, India. His father, Chintapalli Suryanarayana Reddy, was a stage drama writer and director.

Career 
Chintapalli Ramana worked as a dialogue writer for nearly forty films, out of which thirty were super hits. Before entering into the Tollywood, he had written and directed many stage dramas. In the early days of his film career he worked as an associate director with the name Chintapalli Ramanaareddy for many films. He had been introduced as a dialogue writer through the film Chinnabbulu. After that he wrote dialogues for the film Suswagatham.
His third film was Tholi Prema, which became a trendsetter in the Telugu film industry.

Chintapalli Ramana worked with Tollywood top directors namely YVS Chowdary, Srinu Vaitla, Puri Jagannadh, V V Vinayak, Bhimaneni Srinivasa Rao, S V Krishna Reddy, A. Karunakaran, Kodi Ramakrishna  and many more.

Filmography

Filmography as associate director 
 Konte Kapuram
 Dabbevariki Chedu
 Gundammagari Krishnulu
 Todallullu
 Bhamaa Kalaapam
 Pula Rangadu
 Padmavathi Kalyanam
 Police Bharya
 Srivaari Chindulu
 Kobbari Bondam

Filmography as co-writer

Filmography as dialogue writer

References 

 ABN Andhra Jyothi TV - Popcorn Chit Chat With Chintapalli Ramana
 Mahaa News TV - Chit Chat With Chintapalli Ramana On Coffee With Soujanya
 Devadasu – 100 Days Function
 Chintapalli Ramana about PawanKalyan's Suswagatam, Tholiprema & Thammudu movies
 Heart Touching Words About Pawan Kalyan - Exclusive Interview

External links 
 

Year of birth missing (living people)
Living people
Telugu screenwriters
People from West Godavari district
Screenwriters from Andhra Pradesh
Indian male screenwriters
20th-century Indian dramatists and playwrights
21st-century Indian dramatists and playwrights
20th-century Indian male writers
21st-century Indian male writers
People from Palakollu